Tom Pashley (born 14 April 1988 in Cuckfield) is an English former professional squash player. He reached a career-high world ranking of 105 in October 2010.

References

1988 births
Living people
English male squash players